The Alyansa ng mga Mamamayang Probinsyano, also known as the Ang Probinsyano Party-list (APPL) is political organization which has party-list representation in the House of Representatives of the Philippines as of the 18th Congress.

The group seeks representation of farmers, fishers and other marginalized groups in the provinces or rural areas of the Philippines.

Electoral history

2019 elections

Ang Probinsyano sought representation for the first time when it ran in the 2019 mid-term elections. The partylist group seeks to represent the concerns of those residing in therural areas of the Philippines. Its campaign was supported by Coco Martin and Yassi Pressman. The two were known for their acting roles in the ABS-CBN television series Ang Probinsyano which shares the name with the partylist group.

Angelo Palmones former representative of AGHAM Partylist made a bid for the Commission on Elections (Comelec) to stop the proclamation of Ang Probinsyano on the grounds that it allegedly took undue advantage of naming themselves after Ang Probinsyano for name recall. Palmones argues that this gave the partylist, 1,210 minutes of indirect exposure from February 12 until April 5 (from the official start of the campaign season to the date when Palmones' petition was filed) and also took note the endorsement of two of the series' lead actors. The Section 9 of Comelec Resolution 10488 limits campaign advertisements for national candidates to 120 minutes for television which Palmones argues the partylist and ABS-CBN violated.

Ang Probinsyano was among the 51 winning partylist groups proclaimed by the Comelec. It secured 2 seats in the House of Representatives.

Representatives to Congress

Summary

Current representatives

Alfred Delos Santos
Also known as "Apid", Alfred Delos Santos is the first representative of the party-list to the 18th Congress. He was born on December 18, 1991, in Legazpi. He finished his Bachelor's Degree in Business Administration, Major in Financial Management in University of Santo Tomas-Legazpi (formerly known as Aquinas University of Legazpi). He is affiliated with Road Engineering Association of Asia & Australasia (REAAA) where he is an active member since 2015 and as a member of the Kiwanis Club Philippines since 2013.

Ronnie Ong
Rep. Ronnie Ong is the second representative of the party-list to the 18th Congress. He was born on November 2, 1970, and graduated with a Bachelor of Science in Industrial Design from De La Salle University in 1995. At the 18th Congress, he is currently Vice-Chairperson of the House Committees on Rural Development, Foreign Affairs, Tourism, and Games and Amusement, while also serving as Member to the House Committees on Appropriations, Ways and Means, Bicol Recovery and Economic Development, Economic Affairs, and Information and Communications Technology. He is an advocate for legislation and programs centering on labor and employment, fair trade, access to education, rights of children, especially foundlings, overseas workers, senior citizens, and persons with disability (PWDs), as well as animal welfare in the country.

Legislative Agenda

Education
 Schools of the Future (Open High School)
 Digital Basic Education
 8,000 last-mile schools
 Access Roads to All Learners (ARAL)
 Tertiary Education Subsidy (TES) Expansion - 100% coverage of 4Ps families especially in private higher educational institutions
 Operationalization of the National Student Loan Program (income contingent)
 Alternative Learning Systems for Out-of-school youths in all central schools
 Salary increase for public school teachers

Agriculture
 Motorcycles for municipal agri-technicians
 Internet for farmers
 Support for municipal agri-technicians
 Financial literacy law for farmers and rural households

Livelihood
 Technical Education and Skills Development Authority (TESDA) Skills Training (Training for Work Scholarship Program (TWSP), Special Training for Employment Program (STEP), and Technical and Vocational Education and Training (TVET)
 Sustainable Livelihood Program (SLP) Self-Employment Assistance Kaunlaran (SEA-K) re-launch

Tourism
 National support for local festivals to have enough funding for trade fairs, cultural events, and establish local history for every town

Overseas Filipino Workers (OFW) Welfare
 Establishment of Overseas Workers Welfare Administration (OWWA) Provincial Centers
 Higher exchange rate for OFW Remittances

Women Welfare
 Housewife Compensation Law for all women with 0-6 year old children.

Consumer Welfare
 Increase in Unconditional Cash Transfer from P300 to P500

Peace and Order
 Barangay Police Safety Officer Capacity Building (Training, Insurance, PPE Support for Barangay Tanods)
 SK Centers for each Barangay and capacity building for Sangguniang Kabataan
 Barangay Eligibility for SK Kagawads

Environment and Climate Change
 Increase in permanent evacuation centers
 Creation of Department of Disaster Resiliency
 Water for All: Clean Drinking Water for Provincial Households

Technology
 Expansion and promotion of financial technology in rural and provincial areas
 Science for Filipino Society (SFS) Program

Animal Rights and Welfare
 Stray animal rescue, adoption and fostering projects

Health
 Kalingang Dalisay Family Wellness
 Barangay Health Workers (BHW), Nurses, and Midwives in all barangay

Senior Citizens
 Tulong sa Senior Citizen Work Program

Foundling Rights and Welfare
 Foundling Welfare Act of 2020

Programs
Aside from legislative agenda, the Party-List endeavors itself with other programs such as the following:
 KalingAng Probinsyano (Medical Assistance)
 Ginhawang Probinsya (Relief Packs)
 PROvincial scholars Management and Development Initiative (PROMDI) (Educational Assistance)
 TESDA Educational Assistance Movement in the Province (T.E.A.M. Probinsya) (TESDA Scholarship)
 Kaakbay sa Huling Paalam (Burial Assistance)

Apart from the regular outreach and assistance programs, in light of the COVID-19 situation, the Party-List has also engaged in special programs such as distribution of PPE and other essential materials (AlagAng Probinsyano), transportation assistance of OFWs back to their provinces, after the mandatory quarantine (Hatid Probinsyano), and #LibrengSakay UV express van program, which provided home-to-hospital roundtrip service to hundreds of healthcare workers and front liners, and kept UV Express van drivers/operators gainfully employed during ECQ.

References

Party-lists represented in the House of Representatives of the Philippines
Agrarian parties in the Philippines